Electric multiple units have operated on the London Underground since 1898, and exclusively since 1961. They are of two sizes, smaller deep-tube trains and larger sub-surface trains that are of a similar size to those on British main lines.

The Waterloo & City line opened in 1898 with electric multiple units, and the later tube railways followed, using trains that were known as gate stock, as access was via lattice gates at each end of each car. The earlier railways had electrified the underground sections by 1907. Pneumatic sliding doors were introduced on tube trains in 1920 and sub-surface trains in the late 1930s. Until the early 1960s an electric locomotive was exchanged for a steam locomotive on the Metropolitan line beyond Rickmansworth. The Victoria line opened in the late 1960s using Automatic Train Operation (ATO), and the last train with a guard ran in 2000.

Sub-surface stock
Before 1933 the sub-surface lines were run by two companies, the District Railway and Metropolitan Railway. As the Circle line was operated jointly, they collaborated in building a prototype in 1900.

District Railway

Initially District Railway cars were compatible, except for A Stock, and trains were made up from cars of any age, until the incompatible F Stock arrived in 1920. The District classified its rolling stock using letters of the alphabet in 1925, before the fleet was rebuilt, forming main line and local pools. The H Stock designation was used in 1925 for rebuilt B Stock cars and by LT in the 1930s for the remaining cars with hand-operated doors.

Metropolitan Railway

The Metropolitan Railway used both Westinghouse (BWE) and Thomson-Houston (BTH) control equipment, making the cars incompatible. Originally cars had a saloon layout, but after 1906 surplus bogie compartment carriages built in 1898 and 1900 were converted. Compartment stock was introduced on Watford services after 1927.

London Transport
In 1933 the Metropolitan and District railways were merged with the other underground railways, tramway companies and bus operators to form the London Passenger Transport Board (LPTB), which continued the District Railway classification system.

Great Northern & City

Tube stock

References

Notes

Books

External links

London Underground electric multiple units